Bolvadin District is a district of Afyonkarahisar Province of Turkey. Its seat is the town Bolvadin. Its area is 944 km2, and its population is 45,944 (2021).

Composition
There are three municipalities in Bolvadin District:
 Bolvadin
 Dişli
 Özburun

There are 14 villages in Bolvadin District:

 Büyükkarabağ
 Derekarabağ
 Dipevler
 Güney
 Hamidiye
 Karayokuş
 Kemerkaya
 Kurucaova
 Kutlu
 Nusratlı
 Ortakarabağ
 Taşağıl
 Taşlıdere
 Yürükkaracaören

References

Districts of Afyonkarahisar Province